The canton of Delme is a former French administrative division located in the department of the Moselle and the Lorraine region. It was disbanded following the French canton reorganisation which came into effect in March 2015. Its communes became part of the new canton of Le Saulnois. It had 5,605 inhabitants (2012).

Geography
This canton was organised around Delme in the arrondissement of Château-Salins. Its altitude varied between 187 m (Ajoncourt) and 401 m (Puzieux) for a medium altitude of 246 m.

The canton comprised the following communes:

Ajoncourt
Alaincourt-la-Côte
Aulnois-sur-Seille
Bacourt
Baudrecourt
Bréhain
Château-Bréhain
Chenois
Chicourt
Craincourt
Delme
Donjeux
Fonteny
Fossieux
Frémery
Hannocourt
Jallaucourt
Juville
Laneuveville-en-Saulnois
Lemoncourt
Lesse
Liocourt
Lucy
Malaucourt-sur-Seille
Marthille
Morville-sur-Nied
Oriocourt
Oron
Prévocourt
Puzieux
Saint-Epvre
Tincry
Villers-sur-Nied
Viviers
Xocourt

History
It was established as a canton of the former department of Meurthe. It was annexed in its entirety by Germany in 1871, in accordance with the treaty of Frankfurt. It was included into the department of the Moselle in 1918.

Demography

See also
 Arrondissements of the Moselle department
 Communes of the Moselle department

References

Delme
2015 disestablishments in France
States and territories disestablished in 2015